Homer Shiff Saint-Gaudens (1880–1953) was the only child of sculptor Augustus Saint-Gaudens and his wife Augusta (née Homer).  He served as the Director of the Art Museum of the Carnegie Institute and was a founder of the Saint-Gaudens Memorial, a non-profit organization that maintained the family home as a museum before its donation to the National Park Service in 1965.

Saint-Gaudens was instrumental in the formation of the American Camouflage Corps in 1917; another leader was Saint-Gaudens' roommate at Harvard, Barry Faulkner.  With the unit formalized as Company A of the 40th Engineers, Saint-Gaudens commanded the Corps as Captain when they sailed to Europe on January 4, 1918, and deployed to battlefield service.   

Saint-Gaudens was featured on the cover of Time magazine for its 12 May 1924 edition, in connection with his direction and promotion of the annual Carnegie International art exhibition.

References

External links
 

 

 
 
 

1880 births
1958 deaths
American curators
Directors of museums in the United States
People associated with the Carnegie Museum of Art